The Paulino Outdoor Oven is a 20th-century version of a traditional hotnu, or outside oven, on the island of Guam. This oven is located on Paulino family land of Bear Rock Lane on Agfayan Point, a peninsula on the south side of Agfayan Bay in the village of Inarajan. It was built in 1947 for the Paulinos by Jesus Menu Cristostomo out of modern materials, following a traditional form that has been in use on Guam since these ovens were introduced by the Spanish in the 17th century. The base of the structure is coral stone mixed with mortar. The interior of the vault is made out of heat-resistant bricks, while the exterior is finished in alternating layers of red tile and mortar. The oven was used by the Paulino family to prepare baked goods such as dinner rolls and wedding cakes, and to roast pigs. When recorded in 2010, it was in deteriorating condition.

The oven was listed on the National Register of Historic Places in 2010.

See also
 Baza Outdoor Oven
 Quan Outdoor Oven
 Won Pat Outdoor Oven
 National Register of Historic Places listings in Guam

References

Buildings and structures on the National Register of Historic Places in Guam
Ovens
Buildings and structures completed in 1947
1947 establishments in Guam